The 1974 Asian Basketball Confederation Championship for Women were held in Seoul, South Korea.

Preliminary round

Group A

Group B

Final round

Classification 5th–7th

Championship

Final standing

Awards

References
 Results
 archive.fiba.com

1974
1974 in women's basketball
women
International women's basketball competitions hosted by South Korea
B